Theodor von Gosen (10 January 1873 – 30 January 1943) was a German sculptor. His work was part of the art competitions at the 1928 Summer Olympics and the 1932 Summer Olympics. Gosen designed the Beethoven Monument in Alameda Central, Mexico City; it was installed in 1921.

He was appointed to the Kunstschule Breslau in 1905.

See also
 Amor on Pegasus, a 1914 sculpture in Wrocław, Poland.

References

External links
 

1873 births
1943 deaths
20th-century German sculptors
20th-century German male artists
German male sculptors
Olympic competitors in art competitions
Artists from Augsburg